Phillip David Cagan (April 30, 1927 – June 15, 2012) was an American scholar and author. He was Professor of Economics Emeritus at Columbia University.

Biography
Born in Seattle, Washington, Cagan and his family moved to Southern California shortly thereafter. Cagan joined the U.S. Navy at age 17 and fought in World War II. After the war, Cagan decided to go to college, and earned his B.A. from UCLA in 1948.  Cagan received his M.A. in 1951, and his Ph.D. in Economics in 1954 from the University of Chicago.

After graduate school, Cagan joined the National Bureau of Economic Research (NBER) in New York City where he worked for two years. Then Cagan re-entered academia, teaching at the University of Chicago for three years, and at Brown University for seven years.  In 1966 Cagan was hired by Columbia University, where he taught economics for nearly thirty years — save for fifteen months spent in Washington, D.C., when he was on the staff of the Council of Economic Advisors (CEA).

During his time at Columbia, Cagan was also associated with the American Enterprise Institute (AEI) in Washington, D.C., writing on public policy issues.

Cagan lived in Palo Alto, California during his last years.

Contributions to economic science
Cagan's work focused on monetary policy and the control of inflation. Cagan has published over 100 books, journal articles, reviews, reports, and pamphlets on these and other topics in macroeconomics. He is perhaps best known for Determinants and Effects of Changes in the Stock of Money, 1875–1960, a work that sought to identify the "causal relationships between changes in money, prices and output." The book, part of the NBER series that contained Milton Friedman and Anna J. Schwartz's Monetary History of the United States, 1867–1960, was praised for its "careful empirical work" and called "the most complete study in the area."

Cagan's most important contribution to economics, however, is the article included in Milton Friedman's edited volume Studies in the Quantity Theory of Money (1956), entitled "The Monetary Dynamics of Hyperinflation," a work that became an "instant classic" in the field.

The article, which contained "extensive manipulation of differential equations and an ingenious use of exponentially weighted averages", analyzed seven hyperinflations and found that "the parameters of money demand functions estimated during hyperinflation generally satisfy the condition of dynamic stability that precludes the inflation from being self-generating, or displaying period-to-period oscillations."

After its publication, Cagan's article generated a significant body of work, as a number of leading macroeconomists either reexamined or extended Cagan's model, most notably "Barro (1970), Sargent and Wallace (1973), Frenkel (1975, 1976a, 1976b, 1977, 1979), Sargent (1977), Abel et al. (1979), Salemi (1979), and Salemi and Sargent (1979)." In addition, monetary economists today often refer to a "Cagan demand function" when modeling the real value of money.

Because of the impact that this groundbreaking work had upon the economics profession, Cagan was elected Fellow of the Econometric Society (the most prestigious society in the field), and was mentioned as a possible candidate for the Nobel Prize in Economics. However, following his death in 2012, he is no longer eligible for a Nobel Prize.

Selected bibliography
 .
 __, "Why Do We Use Money in Open Market Operations?" The Journal of Political Economy, Vol. 66, No. 1 (Feb., 1958), pp. 34–46. 
 __, "The Demand for Currency Relative to the Total Money Supply," The Journal of Political Economy, Vol. 66, No. 4 (Aug., 1958), pp. 303–328, 
 __, Determinants and Effects of Changes in the Stock of Money, 1875–1960, New York: Columbia University Press (1965).
 __, "The Non-Neutrality of Money In the Long Run: A Discussion of the Critical Assumptions and Some Evidence," Journal of Money, Credit and Banking, Vol. 1, No. 2, Conference on Money and Economic Growth (May, 1969), pp. 207–227. 
 __, Persistent Inflation: Historical and Policy Essays, New York: Columbia University Press (1979).
 __, "Reflections on Rational Expectations," Journal of Money, Credit and Banking, Vol. 12, No. 4, Part 2: Rational Expectations (Nov., 1980), pp. 826–832. 
 __, "The Choice Among Monetary Aggregates as Targets and Guides for Monetary Policy," Journal of Money, Credit and Banking, Vol. 14, No. 4, Part 2: The Conduct of U.S. Monetary Policy (Nov., 1982), pp. 661–686. 
 __, "Does Endogeneity of the Money Supply Disprove Monetary Effects on Economic Activity?" Journal of Macroeconomics, Vol. 15, (Summer 1993).
 Phillip Cagan and William G. Dewald, "The Conduct of U.S. Monetary Policy: Introduction," Journal of Money, Credit and Banking, Vol. 14, No. 4, Part 2: The Conduct of U.S. Monetary Policy (Nov., 1982), pp. 565–574. 
 Phillip Cagan and Arthur Gandolfi, "The Lag in Monetary Policy as Implied by the Time Pattern of Monetary Effects on Interest Rates," The American Economic Review, Vol. 59, No. 2, Papers and Proceedings of the Eighty-first Annual Meeting of the American Economic Association (May, 1969), pp. 277–284 
 Phillip Cagan and Anna J. Schwartz, "Has the Growth of Money Substitutes Hindered Monetary Policy?" Journal of Money, Credit and Banking, Vol. 7, No. 2 (May, 1975), pp. 137–159. 
 __, "The National Bank Note Puzzle Reinterpreted," Journal of Money, Credit and Banking, Vol. 23, No. 3, Part 1 (Aug., 1991), pp. 293–307.

See also
 Monetarism

Notes

Further reading
 
 .

External links
 Faculty Emeriti, Department of Economics, Columbia University
 Major works of Phillip Cagan, New School's CEPA Website
 Overview of Monetarism, New School's CEPA Website
 Thayer Watkins, "Episodes of Hyperinflation,"  San José State University Department of Economics

Macroeconomists
Monetary economists
Monetarists
Fellows of the Econometric Society
Columbia University faculty
Brown University faculty
University of Chicago faculty
University of Chicago alumni
University of California, Los Angeles alumni
Writers from Seattle
1927 births
2012 deaths
Economists from Washington (state)